This is an incomplete list of historical common names. Names may have been changed because they were considered pejorative.

Places

Istanbul
Constantinople

Ho Chi Minh City
Saigon - pre-1976

Mumbai

Bombay - pre-1995

Diseases and disabilities

Down syndrome
Mongolism

Physically disabled
Crippled
Handicapped

Tuberculosis
 Consumption - until 2000s
Tuberculosis

Peoples

Of African descent
Nigger
Negro
Coloured
Black - still in use
African-American - in the United States

Indigenous peoples of North America
Indian - pre-1960s
Native American - since 1960s
Indigenous - 1980s
First Nations

Romani people

Gypsy

Organizations

The Church of Jesus Christ of Latter-day Saints

Church of Christ - 1830 to 1834
Church of Jesus Christ of Latter Day Saints - 1834 onward

See also
Geographical naming disputes
Ethnonymy

References

Naming controversies
Ethnonyms